Luckower See is a lake in the Ludwigslust-Parchim district in Mecklenburg-Vorpommern, Germany. At an elevation of 9.9 m, its surface area is 0.435 km2.

Lakes of Mecklenburg-Western Pomerania